Agustín Sandoná (born 1 May 1993) is an Argentine footballer who plays for Guillermo Brown.

References

1993 births
Living people
Argentine footballers
Argentine expatriate footballers
People from Paraná, Entre Ríos
Sportspeople from Entre Ríos Province
Unión de Santa Fe footballers
Club Atlético Patronato footballers
Club Blooming players
San Martín de Tucumán footballers
Guillermo Brown de Puerto Madryn footballers
Argentine Primera División players
Primera Nacional players
Bolivian Primera División players
Association football central defenders
Argentine expatriate sportspeople in Bolivia
Expatriate footballers in Bolivia